Āśraddhya (Sanskrit; Tibetan phonetic: trel mepa) is a Buddhist term that is translated as "lack of faith", "lack of trust", etc. In the Mahayana tradition, āśraddhya is defined as a mental factor that is characterized by a lack of trust, and lack of interest in, or desire for, wholesome things.  

Āśraddhya is identified as:
 One of the twenty secondary unwholesome factors within the Mahayana Abhidharma teachings

Definitions
The Abhidharma-samuccaya states: 
What is lack of trust (ashraddhya)? It is the mind associated With the category bewilderment erring (moha) which does not have deep conviction, has lack of trust, and has no desire for things positive. It provides the basis for laziness (kausidya).

Mipham Rinpoche states:
Lack of faith (ashraddhya) belongs to the category of delusion (moha). It is to not be interested in what is true and virtuous. It forms the support for laziness (kausidya).

Alexander Berzin explains:
Disbelieving a fact (ashraddhya; Tibetan: ma-dad-pa) is a part of naivety (moha) and has three forms that are the contrary of the three forms of believing a fact to be true.
 Disbelieving a fact that is based on reason, such as disbelieving behavioral cause and effect.
Disbelieving a fact, such as the good qualities of the Three Jewels of Refuge, such that it causes our mind to become muddied with disturbing emotions and attitudes and to become unhappy.
Disbelieving a fact, such as the existence of the possibility for us to attain liberation, such that we have no interest in it and no aspiration to attain it.

See also
 Faith in Buddhism
 Mental factors (Buddhism)
 Kleshas (Buddhism)

References

Sources
 Berzin, Alexander (2006), Mind and Mental Factors: The Fifty-one Types of Subsidiary Awareness
 Bhikkhu Bodhi (2003), A Comprehensive Manual of Abhidhamma, Pariyatti Publishing
 Guenther, Herbert V. &  Leslie S. Kawamura (1975), Mind in Buddhist Psychology: A Translation of Ye-shes rgyal-mtshan's "The Necklace of Clear Understanding" Dharma Publishing. Kindle Edition.
 Kunsang, Erik Pema (translator) (2004). Gateway to Knowledge, Vol. 1. North Atlantic Books.
 Nina van Gorkom (2010), Cetasikas, Zolag

External links
Mahayana tradition:
 Ranjung Yeshe wiki entry for ma dad pa

Unwholesome factors in Buddhism
Sanskrit words and phrases